Pratapgarh Lok Sabha constituency is one of the 80 Lok Sabha parliamentary constituencies in Uttar Pradesh.

Assembly segments
Presently, Pratapgarh Lok Sabha constituency comprises five Vidhan Sabha (legislative assembly) segments. These are:

Members of Parliament

Election results

Notes

External links
Pratapgarh lok sabha  constituency election 2019 result details

Lok Sabha constituencies in Uttar Pradesh
Pratapgarh district, Uttar Pradesh